Charles West, 5th Baron De La Warr (February 1626 – 22 December 1687) was an English nobleman. He is alternatively described as the 14th Baron de la Warr and as Baron Delaware.

He was born in February 1626, the son of Henry West, 4th Baron De La Warr and Isabella, first daughter and coheiress of Sir Thomas Edmondes, Treasurer of the Household.

On 25 September 1642 he married Anne, daughter of John Wilde  of Droitwich.

He died on 22 December 1687. His oldest son Charles West  (1645–1684) having precedeased him, he was succeeded by his second son John West, 6th Baron De La Warr.

References

1626 births
1687 deaths
Charles
17th-century English nobility
Barons De La Warr